Ribeirinha may refer to the following places in the Azores, Portugal:

 Ribeirinha (Angra do Heroísmo), a civil parish in the municipality of Angra do Heroísmo, Terceira
 Ribeirinha (Horta), a civil parish in the municipality of Horta, Faial
 Ribeirinha (Lajes do Pico), a civil parish in the municipality of Lajes do Pico, Pico
 Ribeirinha (Ribeira Grande), a civil parish in the municipality of Ribeira Grande, São Miguel